The 2015 Tour du Haut Var was the 47th edition of the Tour du Haut Var road cycling stage race, held in the Provence region of France. It was rated as a 2.1 event as part of the 2015 UCI Europe Tour, and consisted of two stages over two days, from 21 to 22 February 2015.

Historically, the Tour du Haut Var was the third of three early-season French races, following the Étoile de Bessèges and the Tour Méditerranéen, but for the second year running the Tour Méditerranéen was cancelled due to financial problems, so the Tour du Haut Var came after a two-week break in French cycling.

The 2015 race was particularly notable for returning to the difficult terrain that had been a feature of the race in its early years. In contrast to most stage races, it favoured classics riders rather than pure climbing specialists, and was seen as excellent preparation for the classics season.

The first stage of the race was won from the breakaway by Ben Gastauer, who was able to defend his race lead in the second stage and take the overall victory in the race. These were the first victories of his professional career. The second stage was won by Luka Mezgec. Philippe Gilbert, who finished on the podium both days, won the points classification. The mountains prize was won by Ignatas Konovalovas and the best young rider was Quentin Pacher.

Preview 

The 2014 champion was Carlos Betancur, but he was not selected for the 2015 edition, still being far from the form he had had in the early part of 2014. However, three former champions were present, including Philippe Gilbert, Davide Rebellin and Thomas Voeckler. Gilbert was considered one of the major favourites for the race, while 's Samuel Dumoulin and 's Jonathan Hivert were also expected to ride well.

Teams 
20 teams were selected to take place in the 2015 edition, including six UCI WorldTeams.

 
 
 
 
 
 
 
 
 
 
 
 
 
 Team Frøy–Bianchi

Route 
The terrain of the race was expected to be more challenging than in other recent editions and both stages were expected to suit the puncheurs rather than the sprinters. The first stage took the riders across several categorised climbs. The penultimate climb was the difficult ascent of the Mur de Montauroux (the "Wall of Montauroux"), which had sections of 22% incline, before finishing with the steep climb to Seillans. The second stage took the riders across several more difficult climbs, including the Côte des Tuilières  before the finish.

Stages

Stage 1 
21 February 2015 — Le Cannet-des-Maures to Seillans, 

Stage 1 was a  route from Le Cannet-des-Maures to Seillans. The route was generally hilly and generally used narrow roads. There were four climbs in the first part of the stage, before entering a difficult final section. This included the steep Mur de Montauroux with  remaining, with the descent followed by a section of mild climbing and a steep incline to the finish.

The day's early break was formed by Ben Gastauer, Ignatas Konovalovas, Thomas Vaubourzeix, Roy Curvers and Loïc Chetout. They never built a lead of more than 4' 30", with several of the teams in the peloton chasing hard. Chetout dropped out of the break, but the remaining riders were able to maintain a decent advantage over the chasing pack. At the Mur de Montauroux, they still had a lead of two minutes. Gastauer dropped the remaining riders on the climb and pressed on alone. He admitted after the stage that it had not been his intention to attempt to win the race from the breakaway, but he pushed on, estimating that the peloton behind would be tired. He still had several seconds in hand as he reached the final climb into Seillans and was able to hold the peloton off with a seven-second advantage at the finish line, with Jonathan Hivert second and Philippe Gilbert third.

Stage 2 
22 February 2015 — Draguignan to Draguignan, 

Stage 2 was a hilly route around Draguignan. The  route involved several circuits around the town with six classified climbs. The last of these was the first-category Côte des Tuilières, which included sections of 22% and came  before the finish.

The stage was raced briskly. After  of racing, a nine-man breakaway went away, with  leading the chase in defence of Ben Gastauer's yellow jersey. The breakaway riders were Johan Le Bon, Maxim Belkov, Yannick Martinez, Anthony Turgis, Nikolay Mihaylov, Ignatas Konovalovas, Julien Guay, Antoine Demoitié and Serge Dewortelaer. Turgis attempted to drive the pace on the climb of Col de la Grange  before the finish, but he was not able to distance the peloton. The last of the escapees to be caught was Le Bon, who rode solo into the final  with a lead of over a minute. He was caught soon afterwards, as the peloton reached the Côte des Tuilières.

On the climb, Davide Rebellin, a former champion in the race, attacked along with Julien Loubet , but they were caught by  shortly after the summit. Luka Mezgec was among the riders to be dropped on the climb, but he was able to bridge across from the chase group into the peloton, now reduced to 30 riders. His teammate Chad Haga led him out in the sprint, and he was able to beat Philippe Gilbert to the line, with Baptiste Planckaert in third place. Gastauer finished in the peloton and took the overall victory, the first stage race win of his professional career.

Classification leadership table 
In the 2015 Tour du Haut Var, four different jerseys were awarded. For the general classification, calculated by adding each cyclist's finishing times on each stage, the leader received a yellow jersey. This classification was considered the most important of the 2015 Tour du Haut Var, and the winner of the classification was considered the winner of the race.

Additionally, there was a points classification, which awarded a green jersey. In the points classification, cyclists received points for finishing in the top 15 in a mass-start stage. For winning a stage, a rider earned 25 points, with 20 for second, 16 for third, 14 for fourth, 12 for fifth, 10 for sixth, then 1 point fewer per place down to 1 for 15th place. Points towards the classification could also be accrued at intermediate sprint points during each stage. There was also a mountains classification, the leadership of which was marked by a red jersey. In the mountains classification, points were won by reaching the top of a climb before other cyclists, with more points available for the higher-categorised climbs.

The fourth jersey represented the young rider classification, marked by a white jersey. This was decided in the same way as the general classification, but only riders born after 1 January 1991 were eligible to be ranked in the classification. There was also a classification for teams, in which the times of the best three cyclists per team on each stage were added together; the leading team at the end of the race was the team with the lowest total time.

References 

Tour du Haut Var
Tour du Haut Var
Tour du Haut Var